The following is a list of Major League Baseball players, retired or active. As of the end of the 2011 season, there have been 1,378 players with a last name that begins with C who have been on a major league roster at some point.

C
Enos Cabell
Al Cabrera
Alex Cabrera
Asdrúbal Cabrera
Daniel Cabrera
Everth Cabrera
Fernando Cabrera
Francisco Cabrera
Jolbert Cabrera
José Cabrera
Melky Cabrera
Miguel Cabrera
Orlando Cabrera
Greg Cadaret
Charlie Cady
Hick Cady
Wayne Cage
Trevor Cahill
Bob Cain
Les Cain
Lorenzo Cain
Matt Cain
Sugar Cain
Cam Cairncross
Miguel Cairo
Iván Calderón
Charlie Caldwell
Earl Caldwell
Mike Caldwell
Ralph Caldwell
Ray Caldwell
Kiko Calero
Jeff Calhoun
Carmen Cali
Fred Caligiuri
Will Calihan
Ben Callahan
Joe Callahan
John Callahan (pitcher)
John Callahan (catcher)
Nixey Callahan
Alberto Callaspo
Mickey Callaway
Johnny Callison
Ron Calloway
Napoleón Calzado
Ernie Camacho
Kevin Cameron
Mike Cameron
Dolph Camilli
Doug Camilli
Ken Caminiti
Eric Cammack
Howie Camnitz
Howie Camp
Rick Camp
Shawn Camp
Tony Campana
Roy Campanella β
Bert Campaneris
Al Campanis
Jim Campanis
Count Campau
Archie Campbell
Bill Campbell
Bruce Campbell
Dave Campbell (infielder)
Dave Campbell (pitcher)
Hugh Campbell
Jim Campbell (catcher)
Jim Campbell (pinch hitter)
Jim Campbell (pitcher)
Kevin Campbell
Mike Campbell (first baseman)
Mike Campbell (pitcher)
Soup Campbell
Cardell Camper
Jorge Campillo
Sil Campusano
George Canale
Robinson Cancel
Casey Candaele
Milo Candini
Tom Candiotti
John Cangelosi
Jay Canizaro
Andy Cannizaro
Chris Cannizzaro
Joe Cannon
José Canó
Robinson Canó
José Canseco
Ozzie Canseco
Mike Cantwell
Doug Capilla
Matt Capps
George Cappuzzello
Buzz Capra
Nick Capra
Ralph Capron
Bernie Carbo
José Cardenal
Leo Cárdenas
Conrad Cardinal
Don Cardwell
Rod Carew
Andy Carey
Max Carey
Paul Carey
Tom Carey (shortstop)
Tom Carey (second baseman)
John Carl
Jim Carleton
Walter Carlisle
Cisco Carlos
Dan Carlson
Hal Carlson
Jesse Carlson
Leon Carlson
Swede Carlstrom
Steve Carlton
Buddy Carlyle
Cleo Carlyle
Roy Carlyle
Don Carman
Duke Carmel
Fausto Carmona
Rafael Carmona
Eddie Carnett
Pat Carney
Bob Carpenter
Bubba Carpenter
Chris Carpenter
Cris Carpenter
Hick Carpenter
Charlie Carr
Chuck Carr
Giovanni Carrara
D. J. Carrasco
Héctor Carrasco
Alex Carrasquel
Chico Carrasquel
Cam Carreon
Mark Carreon
Bill Carrigan
Don Carrithers
Brett Carroll
Chick Carroll
Clay Carroll
Cliff Carroll
Dick Carroll
Doc Carroll
Ed Carroll
Fred Carroll
Jamey Carroll
Ownie Carroll
Pat Carroll
Scrappy Carroll
Tom Carroll
Kid Carsey
Matt Carson
Kit Carson
Andy Carter
Arnold Carter
Blackie Carter
Gary Carter
Joe Carter
Lance Carter
Sol Carter
Ed Cartwright
Rico Carty
Scott Cary
Jerry Casale
Paul Casanova
Raul Casanova
Joe Cascarella
Doc Casey
Sean Casey
Dave Cash
Kevin Cash
Norm Cash
Ron Cash
Craig Caskey
Jack Cassel
Joe Cassidy
John Cassidy
Pete Cassidy
Scott Cassidy
Pedro Castellano
Jim Castiglia
Vinny Castilla
Alberto Castillo (catcher)
Alberto Castillo (pitcher)
Bobby Castillo
Braulio Castillo
Carlos Castillo
Carmen Castillo
Frank Castillo
José Castillo
Juan Castillo (second baseman)
Juan Castillo (pitcher)
Luis Castillo
Manny Castillo
Marty Castillo
Tony Castillo (pitcher)
Tony Castillo (catcher)
Wilkin Castillo
John Castino
Don Castle
Foster Castleman
Roy Castleton
Paul Castner
Kory Casto
Bernie Castro
Bill Castro
Fabio Castro
Juan Castro
Lou Castro
Ramón Castro (catcher)
Ramón Castro (third baseman)
Frank Catalanotto
Troy Cate
Danny Cater
John Cattanach
Red Causey
James Cavanagh
Phil Cavarretta
Andy Cavazos
Rex Cecil
Andújar Cedeño
César Cedeño
Domingo Cedeño
Roger Cedeño
Ronny Cedeño
Orlando Cepeda
Matt Cepicky
Mike Cervenak
Ron Cey
Gustavo Chacín
Elio Chacón
Shawn Chacón
Chet Chadbourne
Leon Chagnon
Bob Chakales
Dave Chalk
Elton Chamberlain
Joba Chamberlain
Wes Chamberlain
Al Chambers
Cliff Chambers
Rome Chambers
Chris Chambliss
Mike Champion
Bob Chance
Frank Chance
Spud Chandler
Darrel Chaney
Esty Chaney
Les Channell
Ed Chaplin
Ben Chapman
Frank Chapman
Fred Chapman
Glenn Chapman
Harry Chapman
Jack Chapman
Kelvin Chapman
Ray Chapman
Sam Chapman
Travis Chapman
Harry Chappas
Larry Chappell
Joe Charboneau
Pete Charton
Hal Chase
Ken Chase
Anthony Chavez
Endy Chávez
Eric Chavez
Jesse Chavez
Raúl Chávez
Charlie Chech
Robinson Checo
Harry Cheek
Bruce Chen
Larry Cheney
Tom Cheney
Rocky Cherry
Paul Chervinko
Jack Chesbro
Mitch Chetkovich
Scott Chiamparino
Scott Chiasson
Travis Chick
Matt Chico
Floyd Chiffer
Jason Childers
Rocky Childress
Cupid Childs
Pete Childs
Rich Chiles
Lou Chiozza
Bob Chipman
Harry Chiti
Nelson Chittum
Randy Choate
Hee-seop Choi
Shin-Soo Choo
Bobby Chouinard
Felix Chouinard
Chief Chouneau
Bruce Christensen
John Christensen
McKay Christensen
Larry Christenson
Ryan Christenson
Neil Chrisley
Jason Christiansen
Mark Christman
Steve Christmas
Joe Christopher
Loyd Christopher
Mike Christopher
Russ Christopher
Bubba Church
Ryan Church
Darryl Cias
Joe Cicero
Eddie Cicotte
Ted Cieslak
Gino Cimoli
Alex Cintrón
Frank Cipriani
Jeff Cirillo
George Cisar
Galen Cisco
Ralph Citarella
Al Clancy
Bud Clancy
Jim Clancy
John Clapp
Stubby Clapp
Bob Clark
Bobby Clark
Bryan Clark
Cap Clark
Dad Clark
Danny Clark
George Clark
Ginger Clark
Howie Clark
Jack Clark
Jerald Clark
Jermaine Clark
Jim Clark
Mark Clark
Otey Clark
Pep Clark
Phil Clark
Ron Clark
Spider Clark
Terry Clark
Tony Clark
Will Clark
Dad Clarke
Boileryard Clarke
Fred Clarke
Stan Clarke
John Clarkson
Ellis Clary
Fritz Clausen
Al Clauss
Dain Clay
Danny Clay
Ken Clay
Royce Clayton
Mark Clear
Joe Cleary
Chet Clemens
Clem Clemens
Doug Clemens
Roger Clemens
Matt Clement
Edgard Clemente
Roberto Clemente
Jack Clements
Pat Clements
Lance Clemons
Verne Clemons
Tex Clevenger
Brent Clevlen
Harlond Clift
Monk Cline
Ty Cline
Gene Clines
Jim Clinton
Lou Clinton
Tyler Clippard
Tony Cloninger
Al Closter
Bill Clowers
Bill Clymer
Otis Clymer
Gil Coan
Jim Coates
Buck Coats
Ty Cobb
Dave Coble
George Cochran
Dave Cochrane
Mickey Cochrane
Pasqual Coco
Chris Codiroli
Jack Coffey
Dave Coggin
Rich Coggins
Ed Cogswell
Rocky Colavito
Craig Colbert
Nate Colbert
Jim Colborn
Greg Colbrunn
Alex Cole
King Cole
Stu Cole
Curt Coleman
Dave Coleman
Jerry Coleman
Joe Coleman (baseball, born 1922)
Joe Coleman (baseball, born 1947)
John Coleman (outfielder/pitcher)
John Coleman (pitcher)
Michael Coleman
Ray Coleman
Rip Coleman
Vince Coleman
Walter Coleman
Cad Coles
Darnell Coles
Lou Collier
Dave Collins
Don Collins
Eddie Collins
Eddie Collins Jr.
Hub Collins
Jimmy Collins
Joe Collins
Orth Collins
Phil Collins
Ray Collins
Rip Collins (catcher)
Rip Collins (pitcher)
Ripper Collins
Shano Collins
Wilson Collins
Jackie Collum
Jesús Colomé
Bartolo Colón
Cris Colón
Román Colón
Loyd Colson
Bob Coluccio
Steve Colyer
Geoff Combe
Earle Combs
Merl Combs
Pat Combs
Steve Comer
Charles Comiskey
Keith Comstock
Ralph Comstock
Dave Concepción
Onix Concepción
Ramón Conde
Clay Condrey
David Cone
Bunk Congalton
Billy Conigliaro
Tony Conigliaro
Jeff Conine
Jocko Conlan
Ed Conley
Gene Conley
Snipe Conley
Red Connally
Sarge Connally
Bill Connelly
Ed Connolly (catcher)
Ed Connolly (pitcher)
Joe Connolly (1910s outfielder)
Joe Connolly (1920s outfielder)
Joe Connor
John Connor
Ned Connor
Roger Connor
Billy Connors
Chuck Connors
Joe Connors
Brooks Conrad
Ben Conroy
Bill Conroy
Tim Conroy
Wid Conroy
Billy Consolo
Jim Constable
Sandy Consuegra
Jason Conti
José Contreras
Nardi Contreras
Bill Conway
Dick Conway
Jerry Conway
Rip Conway
Aaron Cook
Andy Cook
Dennis Cook
Doc Cook
Earl Cook
Jim Cook
Mike Cook
Dusty Cooke
Steve Cooke
Brent Cookson
Scott Coolbaugh
Bobby Coombs
Cecil Coombs
Danny Coombs
Jack Coombs
Ron Coomer
William Coon
Jimmy Cooney (1890s shortstop)
Jimmy Cooney (1920s shortstop)
Johnny Cooney
Phil Cooney
Brian Cooper
Cecil Cooper
Claude Cooper
Don Cooper
Gary Cooper (outfielder)
Gary Cooper (third baseman)
Guy Cooper
Mort Cooper
Pat Cooper
Scott Cooper
Walker Cooper
Wilbur Cooper
Trace Coquillette
Alex Cora
Joey Cora
Doug Corbett
Gene Corbett
Joe Corbett
Jack Corcoran
Tim Corcoran (pitcher)
Tim Corcoran (first baseman)
Tommy Corcoran
Chad Cordero
Francisco Cordero
Wil Cordero
Francisco Córdova
Marty Cordova
Bryan Corey
Ed Corey
Fred Corey
Mark Corey
Mike Corkins
Lance Cormier
Rhéal Cormier
Brad Cornett
Pat Corrales
Carlos Correa
Vic Correll
Frank Corridon
Barry Cort
Al Corwin
Joe Coscarart
Pete Coscarart
Shane Costa
Chris Coste
Dan Costello
John Costello
Humberto Cota
Pete Cote
Dan Cotter
Tom Cotter
Ensign Cottrell
Johnny Couch
Mike Couchee
Bill Coughlin
Ed Coughlin
Roscoe Coughlin
Marlan Coughtry
Bob Coulson
Chip Coulter
Fritz Coumbe
Craig Counsell
Clint Courtney
Dee Cousineau
Jon Coutlangus
Harry Coveleski
Stan Coveleski
Chet Covington
Wes Covington
Al Cowens
Joe Cowley
Bill Cox
Billy Cox
Bobby Cox
Danny Cox
Darron Cox
Glenn Cox
Jeff Cox
Jim Cox
Larry Cox
Red Cox
Ted Cox
Charlie Cozart
Roy Crabb
Callix Crabbe
Estel Crabtree
Tim Crabtree
Rickey Cradle
Howard Craghead
Rod Craig
Roger Craig
Jesse Crain
Doc Cramer
Ed Crane
Sam Crane (second baseman)
Sam Crane (shortstop)
Gavvy Cravath
Bill Craver
Carl Crawford
Glenn Crawford
Jake Crawford
Jim Crawford
Pat Crawford
Paxton Crawford
Sam Crawford
Steve Crawford
Willie Crawford
George Creamer
Joe Crede
Birdie Cree
Pat Creeden
Doug Creek
Jack Creel
Keith Creel
Bob Cremins
César Crespo
Felipe Crespo
Jerry Crider
Lou Criger
Dave Cripe
Dave Criscione
Tony Criscola
Coco Crisp
Ches Crist
Hughie Critz
Claude Crocker
Art Croft
D. T. Cromer
Tripp Cromer
Herb Crompton
Ned Crompton
Chris Cron
Jack Cronin
Joe Cronin
Jack Crooks
Bobby Crosby
Bubba Crosby
Ed Crosby
Frankie Crosetti
Zach Crouch
Rich Croushore
Don Crow
Alvin Crowder
George Crowe
Bill Crowley
Ed Crowley
John Crowley
Terry Crowley
Mike Crudale
Deivi Cruz
Héctor Cruz
Henry Cruz
Iván Cruz
Jacob Cruz
José Cruz
José Cruz Jr.
Juan Cruz
Julio Cruz
Nelson Cruz (outfielder)
Nelson Cruz (pitcher)
Todd Cruz
Tommy Cruz
Víctor Cruz
Mike Cubbage
Al Cuccinello
Tony Cuccinello
Cookie Cuccurullo
Michael Cuddyer
Bobby Cuellar
Mike Cuellar
Johnny Cueto
Manuel Cueto
Jack Cullen
Tim Cullen
Nick Cullop (outfielder)
Nick Cullop (pitcher)
Benny Culp
Bill Culp
Candy Cummings
Midre Cummings
Steve Cummings
Will Cunnane
George Cuppy
John Curran
Jim Curry
Steve Curry
Wes Curry
Chad Curtis
Cliff Curtis
Fred Curtis
Harry Curtis
Jack Curtis
John Curtis
Vern Curtis
Guy Curtright
Ed Cushman
Jack Cust
Ned Cuthbert
George Cutshaw
Kiki Cuyler
Milt Cuyler
Mike Cvengros
Al Cypert
Éric Cyr
Jim Czajkowski

References
Last Names starting with C - Baseball-Reference.com

 C